is a passenger railway station located in the city of Kaizuka, Osaka Prefecture, Japan, operated by the private railway operator Mizuma Railway.

Lines

Layout
The station consists of one side platform serving a single bi-directional track.The station is unattended.

Adjacent stations

History
Mori Station opened on January 30, 1926.

Passenger statistics
In fiscal 2019, the station was used by an average of 737 passengers daily.

Surrounding area
 Mori Shrine
Osaka Prefectural Road No. 40 Kishiwada Ushitakiyama Kaizuka Line

See also
 List of railway stations in Japan

Reference

External links

 Schedule 

Railway stations in Japan opened in 1926
Railway stations in Osaka Prefecture
Kaizuka, Osaka